The 2012–13 season was the 111th season of competitive football in Italy.

Promotions and relegations (pre-season)
Teams promoted to Serie A
 Pescara
 Torino
 Sampdoria

Teams relegated from Serie A
 Lecce
 Novara
 Cesena

Teams promoted to Serie B
 Ternana
 Pro Vercelli
 Spezia
 Virtus Lanciano

Teams relegated from Serie B
 Vicenza
 Nocerina
 Gubbio
 AlbinoLeffe

Honours
Trophy & League Champions

Promotion Winners

Playoff Winners

National teams

Italy national football team

Euro 2012

Group stage

Quarter-final

Semi-final

Final

2014 FIFA World Cup qualification

Friendlies

Italy national under-21 football team
2013 UEFA European Under-21 Football Championship qualification Group 7

Play-offs

2013 UEFA European Under-21 Championship
The draw will take place in Israel at 28 November 2012. Italy is in Pot 3 with Germany, Russia and Norway; in Pot 1 there is Israel (assign to A1) and Spain (assign to B1) and in Pot 2 there is England and Netherlands.

Italy women's national football team

UEFA Women's Euro 2013 qualifying

UEFA Women's Euro 2013
The final draw took place on 9 November 2012 at the Swedish Exhibition & Congress Centre in Gothenburg. Italy is in Pot 2 with England and Norway.
Group A

League table

Serie A

Serie B

Italian clubs in international competitions

Juventus

2012–13 UEFA Champions League group stage

Milan

2012–13 UEFA Champions League group stage

Udinese

2012–13 UEFA Europa League qualifying phase

2012–13 UEFA Europa League group stage

Napoli

2012–13 UEFA Europa League group stage

Lazio

2012–13 UEFA Europa League qualifying phase

2012–13 UEFA Europa League group stage

Internazionale

2012–13 UEFA Europa League qualifying phase

2012–13 UEFA Europa League group stage

2012–13 UEFA Europa League knockout phase

Transfers

References

 
Seasons in Italian football
2012 in Italian sport
2012 in association football
2013 in Italian sport
2013 in association football